This is the first edition of the tournament.

Dudi Sela defeated Blaž Kavčič in the final, 6–7(5–7), 6–3, 6–3, to win the title.

Seeds

Draw

Finals

Top half

Bottom half

References
 Main Draw
 Qualifying Draw

Batman Cup - Singles